TFTC may refer to:

 "Thanks For The Cache", a phrase commonly used in geocaching
 Tales from the Crypt (disambiguation), a horror franchise originally published by EC Comics during the 1950s